The Men's road race H1 cycling event at the 2012 Summer Paralympics took place on September 7 at Brands Hatch. Ten riders from nine different nations competed. The race distance was 48 km.

Results
LAP=Lapped (8 km).

Source:

References

Men's road race H1